Stevie is a unisex given name, usually a short form (hypocorism) of Stephen, Steven, Stephanie and other names, and occasionally a nickname. It may refer to:

Stephanie Stevie Cameron (born 1943), Canadian investigative journalist and writer
Stevana Stevie Case (born 1976), American game designer and eSports player
Stephen Stevie Eskinazi (born 1994), South African-born English cricketer
Stephen Flemmi (born 1934), Italian-American gangster and FBI informant
Stephen Stevie Jackson (born 1969), Scottish guitarist, singer and songwriter
Steven Stevie Johnson (born 1986), American football player
Steven Stevie May (born 1992), Scottish footballer
Stevie McCrorie (born 1985), Scottish singer-songwriter
Stephanie Stevie Nicks (born 1948), American singer-songwriter, best known for her work with Fleetwood Mac and solo career
Stevie Ray (fighter) (born 1990), Scottish mixed martial artist
Stevie Reeves (born 1967), American professional stock car racing driver and spotter
Esteban Stevie Rodriguez (born 1994), American footballer
Stevie Ryan (1984–2017), American YouTube personality, actress and comedian, star of the series Stevie TV
Stevie Salas, Native American guitarist
Florence Stevie Smith (1902–1971), English poet and novelist
Stevie Tu'ikolovatu (born 1991), American football player
Stevie Vann, Zambian-born British singer
Stephen Stevie Ray Vaughan (1954–1990), American guitarist, singer, songwriter and record producer
Stephen Steve Winwood (born 1948), English rock singer and multi-instrumentalist
Stevland Stevie Wonder (born 1950), American singer and multi-instrumentalist
Joseph Stephen Stevie Woods (musician) (1951–2014), American singer
Stephen Stevie Wright (1947–2015), English-born Australian pop star singer-songwriter
Stephen Stevie Young (born 1956), Scottish rhythm guitarist and backing vocalist for the hard rock band AC/DC

See also
Steve
Robert Baden-Powell, 1st Baron Baden-Powell (1857–1941), British Army officer and founder of The Boy Scouts Association and the Girl Guides, nicknamed "Stephe" (pronounced "Stevie") by his family

English masculine given names
English feminine given names
Unisex given names
Hypocorisms